The 2010 Spa-Francorchamps GP3 Series round was a GP3 Series motor race held on August 28 and 29, 2010 at the Circuit de Spa-Francorchamps, near the village of Francorchamps, Wallonia, Belgium. It was the seventh round of the 2010 GP3 Series. The race was run in support of the 2010 Belgian Grand Prix.

Robert Wickens cut championship leader Esteban Gutiérrez's (who did not score a point over the weekend) lead by winning race 1 in torrential conditions, following a tyre gamble. Another clever tyre gamble earned Adrien Tambay a first victory in race 2.

Classification

Qualifying

Feature Race

Sprint Race

See also 
 2010 Belgian Grand Prix
 2010 Spa-Francorchamps GP2 Series round

References

Spa
Belgian Gp3 Round, 2010